Vidar Brynsplass (born 1 August 1950) is a Norwegian politician for the Labour Party.

He served as a deputy representative to the Norwegian Parliament from Buskerud during the term 1993–1997. From 1996 to 1997 he served as a regular representative meanwhile Thorbjørn Jagland was Prime Minister. On the local level he was a member of Kongsberg municipality council from 1991 to 1999.

Outside politics he was a factory worker in Kongsberg from 1966 to 1987, worked two years in insurance before becoming active in the local trade union.

References

1950 births
Living people
Members of the Storting
Labour Party (Norway) politicians
Buskerud politicians
People from Kongsberg